= Mohamed Benchellal =

Mohamed Benchellal (born 1984) is a fashion designer and couturier based in Amsterdam. His work is characterized by sculptural silhouettes, couture techniques, volume and the use of deadstock and leftover materials. He established his eponymous practice in 2015. His work has been featured in museums and exhibitions in Europe, the Middle East and Asia.

== Early life and education ==
Benchellal was born in 1984 in Lelystad, Netherlands, to Moroccan parents. His grandparents, who came from Morocco, had a textile atelier, where his curiosity about textiles and sewing began. At home, he experimented with his mother's sewing machine.

He studied at Mode Lyceum in Amsterdam, where he trained in fashion design, pattern making and sewing.

== Career ==
Benchellal began working under his own name in 2015. His practice developed around sculptural garments, direct manipulation of fabric and close attention to construction and fit. He has described his design process as organic, with garments taking shape through experimentation with fabric and the body rather than from a fixed design plan.

Early in his career, Benchellal had limited funds for materials and began working with deadstock and leftover fabrics from the fashion industry, including materials discarded by other fashion houses and manufacturers. What began as a necessity became a continuing part of his working method. He has continued to work with deadstock and leftover materials, designing with what is available rather than sourcing fabric for a predetermined design. The type and quantity of material can determine the form and outcome of a design.

In 2020, he received the Vogue Fashion Prize, followed in 2021 by the Fashion Trust Arabia prize in the Evening wear category. In 2022, he was included in the BoF 500, The Business of Fashion list of people shaping the global fashion industry. That year, he also received the Designer of the Year award at the EMIGALA Fashion Awards and the Outstanding Achievement Award from the African Fashion Awards.

In 2022, Benchellal was invited to present his work in Doha on two occasions. On 28 October, he participated in EMERGE, a Naomi Campbell initiative presented in partnership with Qatar Creates, at Ceremonial Court, Education City. The event was held under the patronage and presence of Her Excellency Sheikha Al Mayassa bint Hamad bin Khalifa Al-Thani. Later that year, on 16 December, he participated in Qatar Fashion United by CR Runway at Stadium 974, curated by Carine Roitfeld and presented in partnership with Qatar Creates. The presentation brought together more than 150 designers from six continents and 50 countries and was attended by more than 20,000 people.

Benchellal's designs have been worn by figures from fashion, film, music and the arts, including Iris Apfel, Alicia Keys, Cate Blanchett, Sharon Stone and Monica Bellucci.

In 2023, Benchellal received the Cultuurfonds Mode Stipendium, a Dutch award for established fashion designers. The award was presented at the Rijksmuseum in Amsterdam, where his work was exhibited as part of the occasion.

Benchellal spent more than two years as a resident at Liwan Design Studios and Labs in Doha, where he developed work in response to Qatar's materials, landscapes, architecture and cultural heritage. The work developed during the residency was presented in his first solo museum exhibition, Benchellal: Monumental — Sculpting Past Tomorrow, at the National Museum of Qatar in 2024.

In 2025, Benchellal undertook an artistic residency in Tashkent through the CCA Artist Residencies programme of the Centre for Contemporary Arts Tashkent. He developed a new body of work drawing on Uzbekistan's architectural and cultural heritage. The resulting work was presented in 2026 at the State Museum of History of Uzbekistan in Tashkent as part of Benchellal: Monumental — Sculpting Past Tomorrow.

In November 2025, Anna Wintour, Francesco Carrozzini and Sheikha Al Mayassa bint Hamad bin Khalifa Al-Thani co-hosted the inaugural Franca Fund Gala and Charity Auctions in honour of the late Franca Sozzani, the longtime editor-in-chief of Vogue Italia. Held at the Museum of Islamic Art in Doha, the event raised funds for research in preventive genomic medicine. A work by Benchellal was among the artworks donated for the charity auction, with Christie's supporting the auction.

== Design and working method ==
Benchellal's work is characterized by sculptural silhouettes, volume, draping and architectural forms. He frequently develops garments directly on a mannequin, manipulating fabric around the body as the shape of the garment takes form.

His approach treats clothing as a three-dimensional form, with an emphasis on the relationship between fabric, the body and architectural space. This approach has also informed his work with cultural heritage and architecture, particularly in projects developed during artist residencies.

Benchellal has described his creations as sculptures rather than simply dresses. His work combines sculptural forms with detailed couture construction and craftsmanship.

== Exhibitions ==
=== MAISON AMSTERDAM ===
In 2021–2022, Benchellal's work was included in MAISON AMSTERDAM at De Nieuwe Kerk in Amsterdam.

=== Piet Paris e.a. – Illustraties, glaskunst, mode ===
In 2023, Benchellal's work was included in Piet Paris e.a. – Illustraties, glaskunst, mode at Museum JAN in Amstelveen.

=== Unboxing: Fashion from the Archives ===
In 2024, Benchellal's work was included in Unboxing: Fashion from the Archives at the Amsterdam Museum.

=== VIRTUOSE: The Artistry of Couture ===
In 2024, Benchellal participated in VIRTUOSE: The Artistry of Couture in Hong Kong, organised by the Hong Kong Fashion Designers Association.

=== Benchellal: Monumental — Sculpting Past Tomorrow ===
From 2024 to 2025, Benchellal presented Benchellal: Monumental — Sculpting Past Tomorrow at the National Museum of Qatar in Doha. The exhibition was his first solo museum exhibition.

=== MOḌA: Moroccan Fashion Statements ===
In 2024–2025, Benchellal's work was included in MOḌA: Moroccan Fashion Statements at the Centraal Museum in Utrecht.

=== Schitteren op Soestdijk ===
From 2024 to 2025, Benchellal's work was included in Schitteren op Soestdijk at Paleis Soestdijk in Baarn.

=== FTA: Threads of Impact ===
From 2025 to 2026, Benchellal's work was included in FTA: Threads of Impact at M7 in Doha.

=== Benchellal: Monumental — Sculpting Past Tomorrow ===
In 2026, Benchellal presented a continuation of the Monumental project at the State Museum of History of Uzbekistan in Tashkent, following his artistic residency in the city.

== Museum collections ==
2024 — The Amsterdam Museum acquired Benchellal's work for its permanent collection in connection with the exhibition Unboxing: Fashion from the Archives.

2024 — The Centraal Museum in Utrecht acquired Benchellal's work for its museum collection in connection with the exhibition MOḌA: Moroccan Fashion Statements.

== Royalty ==
Queen Máxima of the Netherlands

In 2022, Queen Máxima wore a custom design by Benchellal for Prinsjesdag, the annual ceremonial opening of the Dutch parliamentary year. The grey, floor-length robe manteau featured a sculptural wrap and voluminous collar.

Queen Rania of Jordan

In 2023, Queen Rania wore a custom design by Benchellal during the official state visit of the Kingdom of Jordan to Japan. The beige robe manteau featured a structured collar and was worn for the royal couple's meeting with Emperor Naruhito and Empress Masako at the Imperial Palace in Tokyo.

Queen Letizia of Spain

In 2024, Queen Letizia wore a custom design by Benchellal during the official state visit of Spain to the Netherlands. The deep-blue dress incorporated sculptural cuts and a wrap-folding technique.

== Awards and recognition ==
- 2020 — Recipient, Vogue Fashion Prize
- 2021 — Recipient, Fashion Trust Arabia, Evening wear category
- 2022 — Recipient, Designer of the Year, EMIGALA Fashion Awards
- 2022 — Recipient, Outstanding Achievement Award, African Fashion Awards
- 2022 — Included in the BoF 500, The Business of Fashion list of people shaping the global fashion industry
- 2023 — Recipient, Cultuurfonds Mode Stipendium
- 2024 — Honoured at the Uitblinkerslunch at Paleis Noordeinde, hosted by King Willem-Alexander and Queen Máxima
- 2025 — Finalist, Prix de la mode du monde arabe, Institut du monde arabe, Talent innovant category
